The Dassault MD.750 (Mirage 6000 or Mega Mirage or Spectre) was a single-seat twinjet tailless delta interceptor aircraft concept developed by Dassault Aviation beginning in 1958 and being periodically reworked through the 1960s.

Design

The delta wing is mounted low and extends most of the length of the fuselage aft of the intakes, as with other Mirage fighters, and it has a single vertical tail but uses square section intake ramps with a linear shock plate rather than shock cones, as used on the North American A-5 Vigilante and Mikoyan-Gurevich MiG-25 unlike other Mirage fighters, with a similarly boxy fuselage intake section to those types. The existence of the project under the name Spectre was confirmed by Dassault Aviation's Vice-president in a tweet containing several artist's renditions.

See also

Dassault Mirage 4000
Avro Canada CF-105 Arrow

References

Citations

Works cited
 

Dassault Group aircraft
twinjets
French fighter aircraft
Tailless delta-wing aircraft